Snake Hills is a mountain in Barnstable County, Massachusetts. Oak Head is located east-northeast and Telegraph Hill is located southeast of Snake Hills.

References

Mountains of Massachusetts
Mountains of Barnstable County, Massachusetts